Saint Mary's College is an all-male secondary school located in Vigie, Castries, Saint Lucia.

History 
Saint Mary's College opened on 20 April 1890, founded by Rev. Louis Tapon as the first secondary school in Saint Lucia.

Notable alumni 

John Compton, 1st prime minister of Saint Lucia
Derek Walcott, poet, dramatist and winner of the Nobel Prize for Literature
Arthur Lewis, economist and winner of the Nobel Prize for Economics
Philip J. Pierre, 8th prime minister of Saint Lucia
Dunstan St. Omer, painter, muralist and designer of the national flag
Emile Ford, singer
Hunter J. Francois, lawyer and politician
Vladimir Lucien, writer, critic and actor

References 

1890 establishments in the British Empire
Buildings and structures in Castries
Educational institutions established in 1890
Schools in Saint Lucia